Exochiko may refer to two places in Greece:

Exochiko, Koroni, a village in Koroni municipal unit, southern Messenia
Exochiko, Filiatra a village in Filiatra municipal unit, western Messenia